Room No.7 is a 2017 South Korean comedy thriller film starring Shin Ha-kyun and Doh Kyung-soo.

Plot 
Story of a corpse being found in a DVD room by Tae-jung (Do Kyung-soo), a part-timer who works at the store and the owner of the store Doo-shik (Shin Ha-kyun) who is trying to sell the room to keep the secret hidden.

Cast

Main 
 Shin Ha-kyun as Doo-sik
 An owner of a DVD Store who plans to sell it fast
 Doh Kyung-soo as Tae-jung
 A part-time employee at the DVD Store trying to pay off his student debts

Supporting 
 Kim Dong-young as Han-wook
Kim Jong-soo as Real estate agent
 Kim Jong-goo as Vice-principal
 Park Soo-young as Superintendent
 Jeon Seok-ho as Detective Woo
 Hwang Jung-min as Doo-shik's elder sister
 Jung Seung-gil as Doo-shik's brother-in-law
 Jung Hee-tae as Pawn shop employee
 Kim Do-yoon as Tattoo man
 Woo Ji-hyun as Cafe manager
 Kim Ji-young

Cameo appearance 
 Kim Tae-han as Garosu-gil street man 
 Choi Moo-sung as Used-cars dealership owner

Production 
The film is the second film of the filmmaker Lee Yong-seung, who is known for his first film 10 Minutes which was a big hit and earned several prizes at the Busan International Film Festival.

First script reading took place on December 22, 2016. Filming began on January 2, 2017 and ended on February 23.

Release 
Room No.7 unveiled at the Cannes Film Festival on May 18, 2017 and had its world premiere at the 21st Bucheon International Fantastic Film Festival on July 13, 2017.

The film was released in local cinemas on November 15, 2017 and debuted at No. 1 among the Korean films.

References

External links 
 
 
 
 Room No. 7 on KOFIC
 Room No. 7 on Naver
 Room No. 7 on Daum
 Room No. 7 on Movist

2017 films
2010s Korean-language films
2010s comedy thriller films
Films about brothers
Lotte Entertainment films
Myung Films films
South Korean comedy thriller films
2017 comedy films
2010s South Korean films